Andrew Nesbitt (born 2 September 1960) is a rally driver and businessman from Newtownhamilton, County Armagh, Northern Ireland. He is currently co-driven by James O'Brien from Co. Cork. He is best known for driving the Subaru Impreza but first made his name driving a Toyota Celica on the 1996 Donegal International Rally. He defied the odds to beat top drivers such as Bertie Fisher and Austin MacHale. Since then he has had a host of rally wins. In 2000 he broke all records by winning the Donegal International and winning all 22 stages. He went on to become Tarmac Champion in 2000 and 2002. Andrew has taken a number of wins since 2002, but has failed to reclaim the tarmac title. He was often leading rallies or was in a strong position, until mechanical failures let him down. More recently he has performed very well, but has been unable to compete in a full season. Andrew's car is currently sponsored by Rutledge Joblink and Cross-Refrigeration. His car is prepared by McKinstry Motorsport. In 2004 Andrew realised his dream by entering the WRC (World Rally Championship) for the first time. He entered the snow event in Sweden and finished a very respectable 28th, in what is a very specialist event. He was 5th amongst the privateer crews. One of the most remarkable achievements of Andrew's career was winning the Jim Clark Memorial Rally for three consecutive years, breaking the record in the process.
On 11 and 12 August 2007 at Maasmechelen in Belgium Nesbitt contested his first ever round of the FIA European Championships for Rallycross Drivers with a 550+bhp strong spare Saab 9-3 T16 4x4 of Swede Per Eklund. 
Nesbitt recently acquired a Solar energy company, Cool Power, which he later incorporated into Cross Energy, under the Cross-Group, along with its fruit ripening, hire and refrigeration departments. With Cross Energy, Nesbitt introduced Northern Ireland's first solar powered car charger.

References
 "Supreme Nesbitt dominates Clark Rally", The Scotsman.  4 July 2004.
 "Nesbitt leads the Irish jig", The Scotsman.  6 July 2003.
 "Nesbitt takes Killarney title as O Sullivan clinches 8th", The Kingdom.  10 May 2002.

1960 births
Living people
Businesspeople from Northern Ireland
Irish rally drivers
People from County Armagh